Yelena Vyacheslavovna Yudina (born April 22, 1988 in Voronezh) is a Russian skeleton racer who has been competing since 2005. Her best World Cup finish was 11th in Altenberg, Germany in December 2009.

Yudina qualified for the 2010 Winter Olympics where she finished 18th.

References
 

1988 births
Living people
Olympic skeleton racers of Russia
Russian female skeleton racers
Skeleton racers at the 2010 Winter Olympics
Sportspeople from Voronezh
20th-century Russian women
21st-century Russian women